Watertown Stadium is a stadium in Watertown, South Dakota.  It was primarily used for baseball and American football and was the home of minor-league professional baseball including, most recently (c. 1970), the Watertown Expos of the Northern League.  The ballpark has a capacity of 5,000 people and opened in 1940.

It is currently used by Watertown High School, to host baseball and football games.

The stadium was built around the 1930s as Works Progress Administration Project 4265, and still holds the original plaque dedicating the structure. It is the home of the Watertown Arrows.

In 2005, an additional building was built to the East of the field. This building houses restrooms, a concession stand, and both Varsity and Sophomore locker rooms.

The stadium was listed on the National Register of Historic Places in 2000.  It is built of reinforced concrete.

Its NRHP nomination asserts:The Watertown Stadium is a physical reminder of the unprecedented use of government aid to construct community improvements, particularly for recreation and leisure. Built in 1940, the stadium was reportedly planned as a band shelter, since the W.P.A. wanted to build them as part of their music project. According to a local story, the structure was built in phases, and it initially looked more like a bandshell. During the last phase of construction, it was then modified for use as an athletic stadium. Although the story is rumor, the existing structure is an excellent example of W.P.A. construction and one of the more outstanding federal relief projects in the northeastern part of the state.

References

External links

 Ballpark Reviews
 Digital Ballparks

Sports venues completed in 1940
Event venues on the National Register of Historic Places in South Dakota
Art Deco architecture in South Dakota
Buildings and structures in Watertown, South Dakota
Sports venues in South Dakota
Minor league baseball venues
Works Progress Administration in South Dakota
Baseball venues in South Dakota
American football venues in South Dakota
National Register of Historic Places in Codington County, South Dakota
Sports venues on the National Register of Historic Places
1940 establishments in South Dakota
High school football venues in the United States